The 2016 Malaysian Grand Prix (formally known as the 2016 Formula 1 Petronas Malaysia Grand Prix) was a Formula One motor race that was held on 2 October 2016 at the Sepang International Circuit in Selangor, Malaysia. The race marked the thirty-fifth running of the Malaysian Grand Prix, and the eighteenth time that the race has been run as a World Championship event since the first race in 1999.

Mercedes driver Nico Rosberg entered the race leading the World Drivers' Championship by eight points, having reclaimed the championship lead from teammate Lewis Hamilton at the previous race in Singapore. Mercedes lead Red Bull-TAG Heuer in the World Constructors' Championship by 220 points.

Rosberg completed the podium, extending his championship lead to twenty-three points following the retirement of Lewis Hamilton. This was Ricciardo's first win since the 2014 Belgian Grand Prix.

Report

Background
The race was moved from its March date to October to allow organisers the opportunity to upgrade the circuit. The circuit was resurfaced, while drainage was improved to decrease the possibility of standing water from forming on the circuit. Nine corners were re-profiled, introducing negative camber to emphasise mechanical, rather than aerodynamic grip, and the drop at the apex of turn two removed.

Race

At the start, Sebastian Vettel collided with Nico Rosberg going into turn one, causing Rosberg to go into a spin to the back of the grid while Vettel damaged his front-left suspension in the process, retiring after getting to an escape road a few corners later. On lap 8, Romain Grosjean spun into the gravel trap due to brake failure once again, prematurely ending his race. 
Later on lap 41, Lewis Hamilton's engine failed while he was in the lead of the race, forcing him to retire. Esteban Gutiérrez also retired when his front-left wheel came off the car in the latter stages of the race. Daniel Ricciardo who inherited the lead of the race when Hamilton's engine failed went on to win the race. It was the fourth win of his F1 career. Max Verstappen finished second, giving Red Bull Racing their first one-two since Brazil in 2013, with Nico Rosberg recovering to finish third from the spin on lap 1. For the next race in Japan, Vettel was handed a three-place grid penalty for causing the collision with Rosberg.

Post-race  
Nine Australian men, subsequently dubbed the 'Budgie Nine' by Australian media, were arrested for intentional insult and public indecency after celebrating Ricciardo's win by stripping to their 'budgie smuggler' swimming trunks, decorated with the Malaysian flag, and drinking beer from their shoes. Ricciardo said that the nine had not realized the effect their actions would have, and called for them to be released. After three days in custody the nine were charged with the lesser offence of public nuisance and released. The briefs had been made in Australia, not Malaysia.

Classification

Qualifying

Notes:
 – Fernando Alonso penalised 45 grid places for unscheduled power unit element changes.

Race

Notes
 – Nico Rosberg had ten seconds added to his race time for causing an avoidable collision.
 – Esteban Ocon received two five-second penalties for speeding in the pit lane.

Championship standings after the race
Bold text indicates who still had a theoretical chance of becoming World Champion.

Drivers' Championship standings

Constructors' Championship standings

 Note: Only the top five positions are included for both sets of standings.

See also 
 2016 Sepang GP2 Series round
 2016 Sepang GP3 Series round

References

External links

2016 Formula One races
2016
Grand Prix
October 2016 sports events in Asia